Anomoea nitidicollis is a species of case-bearing leaf beetle in the family Chrysomelidae. It is found in Central America and North America.

Subspecies
These two subspecies belong to the species Anomoea nitidicollis:
 Anomoea nitidicollis crassicornis Schaeffer, 1933 i c g b
 Anomoea nitidicollis nitidicollis Schaeffer, 1920 i c g b
Data sources: i = ITIS, c = Catalogue of Life, g = GBIF, b = Bugguide.net

References

Further reading

 

Clytrina
Articles created by Qbugbot
Beetles described in 1920